Poczta Polska (lit. Polish Post) is the state postal administration of Poland, initially founded in 1558. It is the largest mail-handling company in the country, which additionally provides courier, banking, insurance and logistics services. The digital services, such as neo-stamps, neo-letters and neo-postcards, are available through the Internet-based platform 'Envelo'.

The two large subsidiary companies are Capital Group Poczta Polska (Post Bank) and the Pocztowe Towarzystwo Ubezpieczeń Wzajemnych (Postal Mutual Insurance Association). The State Treasury of Poland is the sole owner and shareholder of Polish Post, which is the responsibility of the Minister of State Assets (pol. Minister Aktywów Państwowych).

Statutory obligations 
Poczta Polska acts as a designated operator. i.e. operator who is responsible for providing public postal services, which for common good are provided in a uniform manner at affordable prices. In addition, it must enable the sender, at his request, to receive the document confirming the receipt of the registered parcels.

History 

The basis for the postal organization was the trading postal service, which derived from the merchants' need to communicate on commercial matters. These merchants were from Germany, and later on also from Italy, therefore most active relationships were maintained with them. In the 14th and 15th centuries Cracow was communicating with German towns through messengers, who were remunerated by commercial confraternities. The best designed trading post of this type was owned by the Fugger family who at the end of the 15th century established their factories in Cracow. Initially they were used for the trade of copper.  With time, though, they started to also deal with financing operations. The Fugger Post was primary used only for the maintenance of communications between these factories and the central office in Augsburg. In later years, its services were used by the king Sigismund I of Poland, the queen Bona Sforza and the vice-chancellor Piotr Tomicki.

The second serious trading postal service was the Seweryn Boner's post. Boner's banking house kept permanent agents who facilitated the forwarding of the correspondence of private persons. Seweryn Boner, in agreements with the Thurn und Taxis family post, tried to establish a regular postal service in Cracow, which was enabled on a small scale, however the enterprise was closed down after his death. The death of the Polish queen Bona Sforza in 1557 was the factor that influenced the emergence of the Polish Post, because King Sigismund II Augustus had to maintain permanent and regular correspondence with Italy in order to collect his inheritance. On the 18 October 1558 the monarch granted the right for the establishment and management of the post to the Italian Prospero Provana. The services of this post, which ran from Cracow to Venice, could also be used by private persons, despite the fact that the costs of its maintenance were borne by the crown. Provana, however, started a conflict with the Thurn und Taxis family, who controlled postal communications in Austria, Hungary and Italy. This resulted after four years in the withdrawal of the benefit granted to Provan.

On 11 July 1562 the king concluded a New agreement with Krzysztof Taxis, the executive director of the imperial post in Vienna, on the basis of which, he acquired all posts in Poland, establishing the institution under the name of Poczta Polska (Polish Post), i.e. Royal post. It was composed of the Italian post (Cracow-Vienna-Venice) and Lithuanian Post (Cracow-Warsaw-Vilnius). The postal messenger left Cracow each Sunday morning, arrived in Vienna on Wednesday and then left for Venice, where he arrived after seven days journey. The courier set off to Lithuania each week on Wednesday, in order to arrive in Vilnius after a week's journey. Therefore, the letter from Cracow to Venice took 10 days and from Cracow to Vilnius 7 days. The postal charge amounted to 3 grosz from 1 lot of weight of private parcel. The king's and court's parcels were free of charge, but the monarch paid yearly subsidy for the benefit of the post in the amount of 1500 thalers (1200 for the Italian post, 300 for the Lithuanian post). This amount was collected in instalments from the Cracow duty. The director, who received the total income from the post, in return had to take care of the maintenance and its supplies. Although the Polish post under the management of a new director created new extensive and proper international connection, the contract with Taxis was terminated after two years due to various intrigues.

Italian Piotr Maffon, a Cracow bourgeois, became a new postmaster, who on 9 January 1564 was granted a special right to run the postal service within a period of five years. Within this period a significant regress of this institution was indicated, among all, there was lack of permanent connection with Venice. Due to this fact, the contract with Maffon was terminated before the deadline and Sebastian Montelupi, who was one of the richest Cracow bourgeois, applied for the position of the postmaster. He was granted a relevant privilege on 18 November 1568, however, he took up a position of the postmaster only under the extended privilege of 22 June 1569. As of the date of taking up the post, referred to as “royal post”, by Sebastian Montelupi, its initial development phase finished. Montelupi's Royal Post was responsible for delivering the parcels to the king once a week, when the ruler was residing in any location within the Crown of the Kingdom of Poland, or once every three weeks when he was residing in Lithuania. The route to Venice was operated every 15 days and to Vilnius every 17 days. For his services Montelupi received 1300 thalers yearly and used the payments for private consignments. Furthermore, the royal carriages were also at his disposal. The Montelupi Kamienica located in Cracow at Rynek Główny no. 7 was the principal office of the post office.

Events 
 18 October 1558 – the establishment of the Royal Post, as a formal public institution, by King Sigismund Augustus who “established permanent postal route between Cracow and Venice through Vienna, by means of the post, i.e. horse relay post”. The 18 October is an official Polish Post holiday.
 1928 – the government-owned enterprise Polish Post, Telegraph and Telephone (pol. Polska Poczta, Telegraf i Telefon) was created
 1939 – Defence of the Polish Post Office in Danzig (Gdańsk)
 1944 – Lublin postal district was established, which is considered to be the beginning of the contemporary Polish Post.
 1991''' – a section providing telecommunication services was separated from the state organizational unit Polish Post, Telegraph and Telephone and Polish Telecommunications (pol. Telekomunikacja Polska) was created.
 1 January 2006 – Polish Post introduced the cash on delivery services, at the same time resigning from linking the cash on delivery service with other services (letters, parcels).
 1 September 2009 – Polish Post, as a result of commercialization, was transformed into a joint stock company. Until 31 August 2009 it functioned as a state enterprise of public utility “Polish Post” (Państwowe Przedsiębiorstwo Użyteczności Publicznej "Poczta Polska").

 1 January 2010 – the Polish Post introduced the "E-PARCEL" service
 1 January 2012 – the introduction of a new organizational structure – 62 district branches were transformed into 17 Regions of the Network
 January 2012 – the Post Office introduces the "Dimensional package" service
 January 2012 – the Post Office introduces the "Business package" service
 January 2013 – the Polish Post presents a new visual identification, first post office facility of a new type was opened and a new website of the Post Office was launched.
 February 2013 – courier services of the Polish Post are noting best sales results in the history
 April 2013 – the Flag of the Republic of Poland on the stamp of the Polish Post
 May 2013 – the supervisory Board appointed the Polish Post Management Board of the second term
 May 2013 – According to the UKE, the Polish Post delivery of letters and parcels is faster than before
 September 2013 – the Polish Post introduces electronic notice
 October 2013 – the Polish Post introduces postal e-services: neo-stamp, neo-letter and neo-postcard
 January 2014 – the Polish Post introduces Post an innovative solution for all Polish people or companies that send a large number of items. Packages allow the use of the Polish Post offer at attractive prices.
 April 2014 – the Polish Post introduces new emission of the stamps to honor John Paul II and John XXIII
 May 2014 – New solutions for business called  "Neofaktura" (Neofacture) i Neorachunek (Neobill) on Envelo platform are available. They allow keeping transactions settlement of companies or households accounts in one place on the net. 
 June 2014 – Polish Post launches ecommerce.poczta-polska.pl platform – a place comprehensive support for customers conducting business on the Internet.
 November 2014 – new modern machinery for sorting letters have been installed in few sorting centres of letters and parcels.
 January 2015 –  customers can now take advantage of registered Neolist on Envelo platform, which is recognized in the same way as a traditional registered letter.

 Museums 

The following postal museums function:
 Post and Telecommunications Museum in Wrocław (Muzeum Poczty i Telekomunikacji)
 Branch of the Museum in Kościelec
 Museum of the Polish Post in Gdańsk (Muzeum Poczty Polskiej)

 Services 

 Functioning of the Polish Post at the postal market 

In 2009 the Polish Post recorded losses of 190 million PLN, in 2008 – 215 million PLN. According to the management board of the Polish Post, the popularisation of electronic invoices may bring Polish Post losses in the amount of 170–200 million PLN. In September 2010 the Polish Post jointly with the Ministry of Justice, one of its most important clients, launched the pilot project consisting in electronic confirmation of the receipt of registered mail. At present, the Polish Post has been consistently implementing changes, thanks to which even on negative trends at the traditional postal market, the majority of financial parameters improved. This was achieved despite lower revenue than in 2010. Polish Post gross financial result in 2011 increased with 154% in comparison with 2010 and reached 159 million PLN. Gross turnover profitability of the Polish Post in 2011 amounted to 2.5 proc. This reflects the increase of 1.5 percentage point in comparison with the 2010. In 2009 this indicator was negative and amounted to (-) 2.3 proc.

In 2012 the control of the Supreme Chamber of Control (NIK) indicated that the organization of work of postal facilities is not adjusted to the needs of consumers using its services. The Post Office to an insufficient extent implemented restructuring strategic and the total amount spent on it reached 8 million PLN, and the results of implementation were not verified – whole management board relied on reporting assurances from regional branches, therefore many reforms are of illusory nature. The Post Office also spent 13 million PLN on information system, which did not work.The Supreme Chamber of Control emphasized, however, that since 2010 the Company undertook restructuring measures, which allowed creating the profit for 2011 in the amount of 105.8 million PLN. In July 2011 a new Board was appointed; its main task is the development of the company and the implementation of key restructuring initiatives. The Polish Post plans to carry out the change of the image and organization of work of its facilities, in order to change them into places friendly for customers, offering the unproblematic sale of postal and financial services. New Management Board of the Company puts the emphasis on the development of parcel and courier services as well as offers of the so-called e-services, combining traditional forms of communication with the use of modern technologies.

Gross financial result of the Group in 2012 amounted to 163 million PLN, whereas from the comparable perspective, which takes into account pension contribution with 2 percentage points, is closer to 230 million PLN, which means the increase with 7% compared to 2011. Net ROE indicator for the Group reached 8.8% and is almost 100% higher than the result from 2010. At the same time, the Polish Post reduces costs – in comparison with the previous year there was a reduction of costs to more than 170 million PLN. In 2012 total development investments and investments in staff in the Polish Post amounted to more than 150 million PLN. Further details are given in the annual report of the company for 2012.

The Polish Post wants to allocated more than 1.3 billion PLN until 2017 for financing of the investment plan, including capital investments in strategic areas. Up to 85% of capital expenditures will be financed from the company's own resources. The company opts for the development of the parcel market, modern banking and insurance services, logistics, and digital communication. After 9 months in 2013 the volume of services provided by the Polish Post are 12% higher in comparison with the corresponding period in 2012; the volume of domestic courier services was higher with almost 60 proc. than in the previous year.

In October 2013, the Polish Post launched a new tool, thanks to which the clients can buy and print from the Internet the postal stamps or send letters and postcards, which will be delivered in the paper form by the postman. This is possible thanks to the Internet platform operating under the brand name Envelo'''. It is a solution that enables the use of postal services at any place and time. It is an element of building of the post office 3.0. The Polish Post Digital Services (pol. Poczta Polska Usługi Cyfrowe) company is responsible for the implementation.

In 2013, the Polish Post Group managed to improved its financial results (compared to previous year, with the exclusion of human capital development investments) despite lower by 3.4% revenue, which exceeded 6.5 billion PLN. Lower revenue was compensated by cost reductions, which in 2013 fell by 4% to 6.3 billion PLN. In accounting terms the costs were lower by 2.5% and reached 6.4 billion zł. Comparable gross profit of the Group in 2013 amounted to nearly 200 million PLN, with less than 160 million PLN in previous year. Book gross profit of the Polish Post Group reached in 2013 94 million PLN.

In 2013, Polish Post earmarked 250 million PLN for development investments (compared to 190 million in the years 2011 to 2012), including modernization of logistics (car fleet development) and sales network, as well as development of information technology and capital investment. In subsequent years, Polish Post plans further increase in investment spending. Polish Post managed to reduce Group's operating costs by more than 160 million PLN. Investments in human capital in 2013 amounted to 217 million PLN, over 100 million PLN more than in 2012. Year 2013 was, despite adverse market trends, the fourth consecutive year in which Polish Post reported positive financial result.

Competition 
The Polish Post for years has been systematically losing the monopoly for various types of consignments. Until the end of 2012 it availed from the legal benefit of having the reserved area, which gave it the exclusive rights to provide services, receive and deliver parcels weighing up to 50 g. At the same time, until the 24 September 2008 the owners and administrators of buildings had the responsibility to replace letter boxes, which are owned by the Polish Post, with European letter boxes available for all postal operators.
In 2012 the works concerning the amendment of the Postal Law Act were completed and after the liquidation of the formal monopoly the actual monopoly, e.g. in case of official mail is declining in favor of competitors like InPost.

Other postal operators
 InPost sp. z o.o.
 PGP Polska Grupa Pocztowa S.A.

Gallery

References

External links 

 

Postal organizations
Government-owned companies of Poland
Communications in Poland
1558 establishments in Europe
Postal system of Poland
Polish brands
1558 establishments in Poland